Carlos Pennywell (born March 18, 1956) is a former American football wide receiver. He played for the New England Patriots from 1978 to 1981.

References

1956 births
Living people
American football wide receivers
Grambling State Tigers football players
New England Patriots players